Nurul Momen (25 November 1908 – 16 February 1990) was a Bangladeshi playwright, educator, director, broadcast personality, academician, satirist, essayist, translator and poet. He served as a faculty member in the capacities of professor and dean at the faculty of Law in the University of Dhaka. He also served as a lawyer. He is called "Father of Bangladeshi theatre" and "Natyaguru" (or Natyo Guru or Natto Guru) of Bangladesh (The Grand Teacher of Drama and Theatre). He was awarded the Bangla Academy Award in 1961, merely a year after its inception. He was also honoured by the People's Republic of Bangladesh with the Ekushey Padak in 1978, only a couple of years after this State honor was introduced.

Early life and education 

Momen was born on 25 November 1908. His father was Nurul Arefin, a physician and Zamindar (landlord) in Alfadanga, of the then Jessore district. (After the partition of India, from 1947, Alphadanga is in Faridpur district.) He went to primary school in Calcutta and was admitted in 1916 into Khulna Zila School. At the age of ten he wrote his first poem, Shondhya (Evening), in the same verse as Tagore's Shonar Tory. In 1919 it was published in the journal Dhrubotara. In 1920, he was enrolled in the Dhaka High School where he resided in the Dafrin Hostel. After matriculation in 1924 he studied at Dhaka Intermediate College. Passing intermediate, he enrolled for a BA at the newly established Dhaka University in 1926.

While he was residing at "Muslim Hall" of Dhaka University, the various halls staged the then new play Muktadhara by Rabindranath Tagore. After some initial resistance, Momen received the main role of "Botu". This ignited his passion for drama and even earned him the first prize, but it was also the first time that he performed as actor himself.

After receiving his B.A. from Dhaka University in 1929, he studied law at the Department of Law, University of Calcutta. Upon completing his B.L. examinations in 1936 he started practicing at the Calcutta High Court.

Career

Radio work 

After the foundation of All India Radio in Dhaka, 1939, Momen picked up on the opportunity of the new medium and became its first Muslim author. In 1941 he wrote and directed the comedy Rupantor (Transformation) for the radio. With its progressive plot and a female main character it differed vastly form traditional Muslim plays and was actually the first modern drama of Bangladesh. Upon initiative of the critic, the poet and literary critic Mohitlal Majumder, the play was also published in the yearly Puja issue of the newspaper Anandabazar.

While he was in London for higher studies from 1948 on, Nurul Momen and his friend Nazir Ahmed started a BBC Bengali program, a weekly one-hour format called Anjuman where Momen was responsible for the literary content.

Teaching career 
Rather than continuing to practice law even before the partition of India, Momen joined the faculty of Law at the Dhaka University in 1945. There he was known for including elements from literature and music into the law classes. Sheikh Mujibur Rahman was one of his favourite students, who enrolled in that department in 1948. Nurul Momen encouraged Sheikh Mujibur Rahman to read the works of George Bernard Shaw and Bertrand Russell. He encouraged Munier Chowdhury to get interested in theater and become a playwright. Momen encouraged him to read George Bernard Shaw and got many other students interested in theatre. He later translated You Never Can Tell. From 1948 until 1951 Momen was on leave from the university, undergoing higher studies in England and graduating in law from London University.

The Theatre Theorist

Natyaguru Nurul Momen has ushered in a New theory of dramaturgy in the world, alongside many practical & theoretical contributions in the world of Dramatics and literature.

The Fourth Unity

In 1944, the Bengal playwright Natyaguru Nurul Momen, introduced the fourth unity in his pioneering tragedy play, Nemesis (Momen play) . In this epoch-making one character play (in other words, "Monodrama"), Nurul Momen immaculately maintained all the three Aristotelian unities of classical Greek theatre --- and added the fourth unity for the first time in world theatre.

In the preface of Nemesis (Momen Play) the Natyaguru wrote, " In this play a fourth Unity is added to the traditional three unities of The Greek Tragedies -- Time, Space & Action. A new experimentation has been done by introducing a new unity --- "Unity of Person" despite maintaining the format of The three unities. "

Literary works

Awards
 Bangla Academy Award best Playwright and litterateur, 1961
 Ekushey Padak for Drama and literature, 1978
 Sitara-e-Imtiaz, 1967 (which he renounced and destroyed in 1971)

Personal life
In 1936 Momen married Amena Momen, née Khatun (died 1993). They had four children – Momena Momen Saara (died 1995), Ahmad Nurul Momen (died 2009), Hammad Nurul Momen and Faisal Mahmud Tukun Nurul Momen.

Legacy 
On 25 November 2008, his birth centenary was celebrated at the Bangladesh Shilpakala Academy (BSA). His 102nd birthday was celebrated in November 2010 with a week-long festival, organized again by the BSA together with the Aurony Mohona International Foundation (AMIF).

References

External links 
 Daily Star_25 Nov.2008: Birth anniversary of Natyaguru Nurul Momen

A TV program on Natyaguru Nurul Momen https://m.youtube.com/watch?v=ki69H8j9hoI
 Daily Star_ 16 Feb.2008: 18th death anniversary of  Nurul Momen
 Daily Star_ 2 Jun.2007: Homage to Nurul Momen
 Daily Star_ 25 Apr.2008:Bangladesh Shilpakala Academy's tribute to Nurul Momen
 ..displayed live performances, video installation and photographs at twelve pavilions, which were named in the memory of late theatre personalities of the country such as AKM Bazlul Karim, Moksud-us-Saleheen, Nurul Momen..
 in Bangalee Shamagra museum there are 60 portraits of celebrated Bangalees in different fields of the society

Bangladeshi dramatists and playwrights
Bengali-language writers
1908 births
1990 deaths
University of Dhaka alumni
University of Calcutta alumni
Academic staff of the University of Dhaka
Bangladeshi theatre directors
20th-century dramatists and playwrights
Male dramatists and playwrights
Recipients of Bangla Academy Award
20th-century Bangladeshi male writers
Recipients of the Ekushey Padak